Eta Crateris, Latinized from η Crateris,  is a solitary star in the southern constellation of Crater. It marks the lip of the tilted bowl on the left side in the constellation. Eta Crateris lies in the sky NE of Zeta Crateris and NNW of 31 Crateris, the three stars forming an almost perfect right triangle with Eta at the right angle and 31 and Zeta the ends of the hypotenuse. Eta Crateris also lies to the right (west) of the bright star Gamma Corvi.

This star is faintly visible to the naked eye with an apparent visual magnitude of 5.17. With an annual parallax shift of 12.97 mas as seen from Earth, it is located around 280 light years from the Sun. At that distance, the visual magnitude is diminished by an extinction factor of 0.08 due to interstellar dust. The star is receding from the Sun with a radial velocity of +15 km/s.

Eta Crateris is an ordinary A-type main sequence star with a stellar classification of A0 V. It is about 2.7 times the radius of the Sun and radiates 48.5 times the solar luminosity from its outer atmosphere at an effective temperature of 9,687 K. It 350 million years old and is spinning with a projected rotational velocity of 65 km/s.

References

A-type main-sequence stars
Crater (constellation)
Crateris, Eta
Durchmusterung objects
Crateris, 30
103632
058188
4567